LYRA (Lyman Alpha Radiometer) is the solar UV radiometer on board Proba-2, a European Space Agency technology demonstration satellite that was launched on November 2, 2009.

LYRA has been designed and manufactured by a Belgian-Swiss-German consortium (ROB-SIDC, PMOD/WRC, IMOMEC, CSL, MPS and BISA) with additional international collaborations (Japan, USA, Russia, and France). Jean-François Hochedez (ROB) is Principal Investigator, Yves Stockman (CSL) is Project Manager, and Werner Schmutz (PMOD) is Lead co-Investigator.

LYRA will monitor the Solar irradiance in four UV passbands. They have been chosen for their relevance to solar physics, aeronomy and Space Weather:
 the 115-125 nm Lyman-α channel,
 the 200-220 nm Herzberg continuum channel,
 the Aluminium filter channel (17-50 nm) including He II at 30.4 nm, and
 the Zirconium filter channel (1-20 nm).
The Radiometric calibration of the instrument is traceable to Synchrotron source standards, Physikalisch-Technische Bundesanstalt (PTB) and National Institute of Standards and Technology (NIST). Its stability will be monitored by onboard calibration light sources (light-emitting diodes), which allow distinguishing between potential degradations of the detectors and filters. Additionally, a redundancy strategy contributes to the accuracy and the stability of the measurements. LYRA will benefit from wide bandgap detectors based on diamond: it will be the first space assessment of a pioneering UV detectors program. Diamond sensors make the instruments radiation-hard and solar-blind: their high bandgap energy makes them quasi-insensitive to visible light (see also references in Marchywka Effect). The SWAP extreme ultraviolet (EUV) imaging telescope will operate next to LYRA on Proba-2. Together, they will establish a high performance solar monitor for operational space weather nowcasting and research. LYRA demonstrates technologies important for future missions such as the ESA Solar Orbiter mission.

References

European Space Agency
Spacecraft instruments
Radiometry